Nathaniel Fish Moore (December 25, 1782 – April 27, 1872) was the eighth president of Columbia College; he had earlier been a lawyer and served on the faculty. He was the nephew of the college's former president Benjamin Moore.

In 1820, Moore began his career at Columbia College as a professor of Greek and Latin, which in 1830 became titled the Jay Professor of the Greek Language and Literature. He was appointed the first full-time Librarian of the College in 1838. Four years later, Moore was elected the eighth president of the college, resigning under unremarkable circumstances in 1849.

Selected publications
;

Notes

Columbia College (New York) alumni
Presidents of Columbia University
Columbia University faculty
Columbia University librarians
1782 births
1872 deaths
American librarians
American photographers